The Eisriesenwelt (German for "World of the Ice Giants") is a natural limestone and ice cave located in Werfen, Austria, about 40 km south of Salzburg.  The cave is inside the Hochkogel mountain in the Tennengebirge section of the Alps.  It is the largest ice cave in the world, extending more than 42 km and visited by about 200,000 tourists every year.

Geology 

The Tennengebirge mountains were formed during the late Tertiary period, during the Würm glaciation period of the Pleistocene. The mountain range, one of the massifs in the Austrian Alps, is the largest karst plateau in the Salzburger Alps, and the Eisriesenwelt is located at the rim of this plateau. Although the cave has a length of 42 km, only the first kilometer, the area that tourists are allowed to visit, is covered in ice. The rest of the cave is formed of limestone.

Eisriesenwelt was formed by the Salzach river, which eroded passageways into the mountain.  The ice formations in the cave were formed by thawing snow which drained into the cave and froze during winter.

Since the entrance to the caves is open year-round, chilly winter winds blow into the cave and freeze the snow inside. In summer, a cold wind from inside the cave blows toward the entrance and prevents the formations from melting.

History 
The first official discovery of Eisriesenwelt was by Anton Posselt, a natural scientist from Salzburg, in 1879, though he only explored the first two hundred meters of the cave. Before his discovery, the cave was known only to locals, who, believing that it was an entrance to Hell, refused to explore it. In 1880, Posselt published his findings in a mountaineering magazine, but the report was quickly forgotten.

, a speleologist from Salzburg, was one of the few people who remembered Posselt's discovery. He led several expeditions into the caves beginning in 1912, which were soon followed by other explorers. Von Mörk was killed in World War I in 1914, and an urn containing his ashes is inside a niche in the cave. In 1920, a cabin for the explorers, Forscherhütte, was built and the first routes up the mountain were established. Tourists began to arrive soon after, attracted by the cave's sudden popularity. Later another cabin, the Dr. Oedl House, and paths from Werfen and Tenneck were constructed.

In 1955 a cable car was built, shortening the 90-minute climb to 3 minutes. The Forest Commission still receives a percentage of the entrance fees.

Visiting 

The cave is open from May 1 to October 26 every year.  Its operating hours are 9:00 a.m. to 4:30 p.m. in July and August and 9:00 a.m. to 3:30 p.m. in May/June and September/October.  Temperatures inside the cave are usually below freezing, and warm clothing is recommended. Photography is not permitted once visitors are inside the cave.

The tour begins at the entrance to the cave, and continues inwards to Posselt Hall, a large room with a stalagmite called Posselt Tower in the centre. Past the Posselt Tower, one encounters an ashen cross on the wall of the cave, marking the farthest point of exploration of Anton Posselt. From there one can see the Great Ice Embankment, a massive formation that rises to a height of 25 metres and represents the area of greatest ice growth. Next is Hymir's Castle, named after a giant in Norse mythology. Here stalactites create a formation called Frigga's Veil, or the Ice Organ.

Next on the tour is the Alexander von Mörk Cathedral, one of the largest rooms in the cave and the final resting place of von Mörk's ashes. The final stop on the tour is the Ice Palace, a kilometre into the cave and 400 metres underground. From here, visitors must turn around and walk back through the caves to reach the entrance.  The round-trip tour through the cave takes around one hour and 15 minutes.

Gallery

References

External links 

 
 Travel guide
 Cave information
 Tourist's description of visiting the cave
 Description of Tennengebirge geology

Limestone caves
Caves of Austria
Ice caves
Show caves in Austria
Landforms of Salzburg (state)
Tourist attractions in Salzburg (state)